The Argentine anchoita (Engraulis anchoita) or Argentine anchovy is an anchovy of the genus Engraulis, found in and around waters of Argentina, Uruguay and southern Brazil.

Description
It grows to  SL or  TL. Spawning takes place throughout the year but is most intense and close to shore in October/November, and more offshore and less intensely in May/June.

Ecology
Engraulis anchoita is a key species in the pelagic ecosystem of the Argentine waters. They are zooplanktivores, and prey especially upon copepods, but also their own eggs. Engraulis anchoita themselves are prey to other species, and constitute a main diet component of important commercial species such as hake, squid and mackerel.

Fishery
Annual catches of Engraulis anchoita in 2000–2009 varied between 12 and 44 thousand tonnes, mainly taken by Argentina.

References

Argentine anchoita
Fauna of Temperate South America
Fish of Argentina
Fish of the Western Atlantic
Argentine anchoita
Anchovies